Sir Ernest Samuel Beoku-Betts MBE (March 15, 1895 – 1957) was a prominent Sierra Leonean Krio lawyer who was very active in civic matters. He served first as member of the Freetown City Council and subsequently as its mayor (1925–1926). He improved the city and reorganized the council. He was also elected to the Legislative Council in 1924, where he worked closely with Herbert Bankole-Bright.

In 1937, Beoku-Betts left politics  and became police magistrate. He assumed more senior positions during the years and was the first national to be the Vice-President of the Legislative Council.

He was knighted by Queen Elizabeth the year of his death. He had won recognition for the legal progress of Sierra Leone during the colonial period as well as constitutional progress toward independence.

External links
Sierra Leone Heroes

Sierra Leone Creole people
Mayors of Freetown
1895 births
1957 deaths
People educated at the Sierra Leone Grammar School
Members of the Legislative Council of Sierra Leone
 Sierra Leonean knights
20th-century Sierra Leonean lawyers